Ivan Stoilković (born 15 February 1962) is a politician in North Macedonia from the country's Serb minority. He is the president of the Democratic Party of Serbs in Macedonia and a member of the Assembly of North Macedonia.

Biography 
He was born on 15 February 1962 in Kumanovo. After finishing high school, he enrolled at the Faculty of Law at the Ss. Cyril and Methodius University of Skopje. In 1992, he founded the Democratic Party of Serbs in Macedonia. Since 2002, he has been a member of the Assembly of North Macedonia. He is the chair of the Parliamentary Group of the Assembly of the Republic of Macedonia for Cooperation with the Parliament of Russian Federation.

In an 2018 interview he said that relations between Serbia and Macedonia have never been worse because of Macedonia's Anti-Serbian politics.

See also 

 Serbs of North Macedonia

References 

1962 births
Living people
Serbs of North Macedonia
Members of the Assembly of North Macedonia
Ss. Cyril and Methodius University of Skopje alumni
Macedonian politicians